Anagusa is an island in Louisiade Archipelago, part of the Bentley Group . Politically it belongs to Milne Bay Province in the southeastern part of Papua New Guinea. For 2014 census, the island had a village of 122 residents in 21 households, although at least 1 family lives in nearby island of Nare.

Geography

Anagusa is located 10 km south of the Engineer Islands. It was settled by migrants from Normanby and Wari islands. The style of the Anagusa pottery is similar to those of the people of Wari. The population consists of fishermen and farmers. The closest island is Nare (Mudge) Island 6.8 km south-east.

The inhabitants of the island speak Bwanabwana.

Administratively, the island belongs to Bwanabwana LLG (Local Level Government area) of the Samarai-Murua District in Milne Bay Province.

References

Islands of Milne Bay Province
Louisiade Archipelago